Paul Myron Anthony Linebarger (July 11, 1913 – August 6, 1966), better known by his pen-name Cordwainer Smith, was an American author known for his science fiction works. Linebarger was a US Army officer, a noted East Asia scholar, and an expert in psychological warfare. Although his career as a writer was shortened by his death at the age of 53, he is considered one of science fiction's more influential and talented authors.

Early life and education
Linebarger's father, Paul Myron Wentworth Linebarger, was a lawyer, working as a judge in the Philippines. There he met Chinese nationalist Sun Yat-sen to whom he became an advisor. Linebarger's father sent his wife to give birth in Milwaukee, Wisconsin so that their child would be eligible to become president of the United States. Sun Yat-sen, who was considered the father of Chinese nationalism, became Linebarger's godfather.

His young life  was unsettled as his father moved the family to a succession of places in Asia, Europe, and the United States. He was sometimes sent to boarding schools for safety. In all, Linebarger attended more than 30 schools. In 1919, while at a boarding school in Hawaii, he was blinded in his right eye and it was replaced by a glass eye. The vision in his remaining eye was impaired by infection.

Linebarger was familiar with English, German, and Chinese by adulthood. At the age of 23, he received a PhD in political science from Johns Hopkins University.

Career

From 1937 to 1946, Linebarger held a faculty appointment at Duke University, where he began producing highly regarded works on Far Eastern affairs.

While retaining his professorship at Duke after the beginning of World War II, Linebarger began serving as a second lieutenant of the United States Army, where he was involved in the creation of the Office of War Information and the Operation Planning and Intelligence Board. He also helped organize the army's first psychological warfare section. In 1943, he was sent to China to coordinate military intelligence operations. When he later pursued his interest in China, Linebarger became a close confidant of Chiang Kai-shek. By the end of the war, he had risen to the rank of major.

In 1947, Linebarger moved to the Johns Hopkins University's School of Advanced International Studies in Washington, DC, where he served as Professor of Asiatic Studies. He used his experiences in the war to write the book Psychological Warfare (1948), regarded by many in the field as a classic text.

He eventually rose to the rank of colonel in the reserves. He was recalled to advise the British forces in the Malayan Emergency and the U.S. Eighth Army in the Korean War. While he was known to call himself a "visitor to small wars", he refrained from becoming involved in the Vietnam War, but is known to have done work for the Central Intelligence Agency.  In 1969 CIA officer Miles Copeland Jr. wrote that Linebarger was "perhaps the leading practitioner of 'black' and 'gray' propaganda in the Western world". According to Joseph Burkholder Smith, a former CIA operative, he conducted classes in psychological warfare for CIA agents at his home in Washington under cover of his position at the School of Advanced International Studies. He traveled extensively and became a member of the Foreign Policy Association, and was called upon to advise President John F. Kennedy.

Marriage and family

In 1936, Linebarger married Margaret Snow. They had a daughter in 1942 and another in 1947. They divorced in 1949.

In 1950, Linebarger married again to Genevieve Collins; they had no children. They remained married until his death from a heart attack in 1966, at Johns Hopkins University Medical Center in Baltimore, Maryland, at age 53. Linebarger had expressed a wish to retire to Australia, which he had visited in his travels. He is buried in Arlington National Cemetery, Section 35, Grave Number 4712. His widow, Genevieve Collins Linebarger, was interred with him on November 16, 1981.

Case history debate
Linebarger is long rumored to have been "Kirk Allen", the fantasy-haunted subject of "The Jet-Propelled Couch," a chapter in psychologist Robert M. Lindner's best-selling 1954 collection The Fifty-Minute Hour. According to Cordwainer Smith scholar Alan C. Elms, this speculation first reached print in Brian Aldiss's 1973 history of science fiction, Billion Year Spree; Aldiss, in turn, claimed to have received the information from science fiction fan and scholar Leon Stover. More recently, both Elms and librarian Lee Weinstein have gathered circumstantial evidence to support the case for Linebarger's being Allen, but both concede there is no direct proof that Linebarger was ever a patient of Lindner's or that he suffered from a disorder similar to that of Kirk Allen.

Science fiction style
According to Frederik Pohl:

Linebarger's identity as "Cordwainer Smith" was secret until his death.  ("Cordwainer" is an archaic word for "a worker in cordwain or cordovan leather; a shoemaker", and a "smith" is "one who works in iron or other metals; esp. a blacksmith or farrier": two kinds of skilled workers with traditional materials.)
Linebarger also employed the literary pseudonyms "Carmichael Smith" (for his political thriller Atomsk), "Anthony Bearden" (for his poetry) and "Felix C. Forrest" (for the novels Ria and Carola).

Some of Smith's stories are written in narrative styles closer to traditional Chinese stories than to most English-language fiction, as well as reminiscent of the Genji tales of Lady Murasaki. The total volume of his science fiction output is relatively small, because of his time-consuming profession and his early death.

Smith's works consist of one novel, originally published in two volumes in edited form as The Planet Buyer, also known as The Boy Who Bought Old Earth (1964) and The Underpeople (1968), and later restored to its original form as Norstrilia (1975); and 32 short stories (collected in The Rediscovery of Man (1993), including two versions of the short story "War No. 81-Q").

Linebarger's cultural links to China are partially expressed in the pseudonym "Felix C. Forrest", which he used in addition to "Cordwainer Smith": his godfather Sun Yat-Sen suggested to Linebarger that he adopt the Chinese name "Lin Bai-lo", which may be roughly translated as "Forest of Incandescent Bliss". ("Felix" is Latin for "happy".) In his later years, Linebarger proudly wore a tie with the Chinese characters for this name embroidered on it.

As an expert in psychological warfare, Linebarger was very interested in the newly developing fields of psychology and psychiatry. He used many of their concepts in his fiction. His fiction often has religious overtones or motifs, particularly evident in characters who have no control over their actions. James B. Jordan argued for the importance of Anglicanism to Smith's works back to 1949. But Linebarger's daughter Rosana Hart has indicated that he did not become an Anglican until 1950, and was not strongly interested in religion until later still. The introduction to the collection Rediscovery of Man notes that from around 1960 Linebarger became more devout and expressed this in his writing. Linebarger's works are sometimes included in analyses of Christianity in fiction, along with the works of authors such as C. S. Lewis and J.R.R. Tolkien.

Most of Smith's stories are set in the far future, between 4,000 and 14,000 years from now. After the Ancient Wars devastate Earth, humans, ruled by the Instrumentality of Mankind, rebuild and expand to the stars in the Second Age of Space around 6000 AD. Over the next few thousand years, mankind spreads to thousands of worlds and human life becomes safe but sterile, as robots and the animal-derived Underpeople take over many human jobs and humans themselves are genetically programmed as embryos for specified duties. Towards the end of this period, the Instrumentality attempts to revive old cultures and languages in a process known as the Rediscovery of Man, where humans emerge from their mundane utopia and Underpeople are freed from slavery.

For years, Linebarger had a pocket notebook which he had filled with ideas about The Instrumentality and additional stories in the series. But while in a small boat in a lake or bay in the mid 60s, he leaned over the side, and his notebook fell out of his breast pocket into the water, where it was lost forever. Another story claims that he accidentally left the notebook in a restaurant in Rhodes in 1965. With the book gone, he felt empty of ideas, and decided to start a new series which was an allegory of Mid-Eastern politics.

Smith's stories describe a long future history of Earth. The settings range from a postapocalyptic landscape with walled cities, defended by agents of the Instrumentality, to a state of sterile utopia, in which freedom can be found only deep below the surface, in long-forgotten and buried anthropogenic strata. These features may place Smith's works within the Dying Earth subgenre of science fiction. They are ultimately more optimistic and distinctive.

Smith's most celebrated short story is his first-published, "Scanners Live in Vain", which led many of its earliest readers to assume that "Cordwainer Smith" was a new pen name for one of the established giants of the genre. It was selected as one of the best science fiction short stories of the pre-Nebula Award period by the Science Fiction and Fantasy Writers of America, appearing in The Science Fiction Hall of Fame Volume One, 1929-1964.  "The Ballad of Lost C'Mell" was similarly honored, appearing in The Science Fiction Hall of Fame, Volume Two.

After "Scanners Live in Vain", Smith's next story did not appear for several years, but from 1955 until his death in 1966 his stories appeared regularly, for the most part in Galaxy Science Fiction. His universe featured creations such as:
 The planet Norstrilia (Old North Australia), a semi-arid planet where an immortality drug called stroon is harvested from gigantic, virus-infected sheep each weighing more than 100 tons. Norstrilians are nominally the richest people in the galaxy and defend their immensely valuable stroon with sophisticated weapons (as shown in the story "Mother Hitton's Littul Kittons"). However, extremely high taxes ensure that everyone on the planet lives a frugal, rural life, like the farmers of old Australia, to keep the Norstrilians tough.
 The punishment world Shayol (cf. Sheol), where criminals are punished by the regrowth and harvesting of their organs for transplanting
 Planoforming spacecraft, which are crewed by humans telepathically linked with cats to defend against the attacks of malevolent entities in space, which are perceived by the humans as dragons, and by the cats as gigantic rats, in "The Game of Rat and Dragon".
 The Underpeople, animals modified into human form and intelligence to fulfill servile roles, and treated as property. Several stories feature clandestine efforts to liberate the Underpeople and grant them civil rights. They are seen everywhere throughout regions controlled by the Instrumentality. Names of Underpeople have a single-letter prefix based on their animal species. Thus C'Mell ("The Ballad of Lost C'Mell") is cat-derived; D'Joan ("The Dead Lady of Clown Town"), a Joan of Arc figure, is descended from dogs; and B'dikkat ("A Planet Named Shayol") has bovine ancestors.
 Habermans and their supervisors, Scanners, who are essential for space travel, but at the cost of having their sensory nerves cut to block the "pain of space", and who perceive only by vision and various life-support implants. A technological breakthrough removes the need for the treatment, but resistance among the Scanners to their perceived loss of status ensues, forming the basis of the story "Scanners Live in Vain".
 Early works in the timeline include neologisms which are not explained to any great extent, but serve to produce an atmosphere of strangeness. These words are usually derived from non-English words. For instance, manshonyagger derives from the German words "menschen" meaning, in some senses, "men" or "mankind", and "jäger", meaning a hunter, and refers to war machines that roam the wild lands between the walled cities and prey on men, except for those they can identify as Germans. Another example is "Meeya Meefla", the only city to have preserved its name from the pre-atomic era: evidently Miami, Florida, from its abbreviated form (as on road signs) "MIAMI FLA".
 Character names in the stories often derive from words in languages other than English. Smith seemed particularly fond of using numbers for this purpose. For instance, the name "Lord Sto Odin" in the story "Under Old Earth" is derived from the Russian words for "One hundred and one", сто один; it also suggests the name of the Norse god Odin. Quite a few of the names mean "five-six" in different languages, including both the robot Fisi (fi[ve]-si[x]), the dead Lady Panc Ashash (in Sanskrit "pañcha" [पञ्च] is "five" and "ṣaṣ" [षष्] is "six"), Limaono (lima-ono, Hawaiian and/or Fijian), Englok (ng5-luk6 [五-六], in Cantonese), Goroke (go-roku [五-六], Japanese) and Femtiosex ("fifty-six" in Swedish) in "The Dead Lady of Clown Town" as well as the main character in "Think Blue, Count Two", Veesey-koosey, which is an English transcription of the Finnish words "viisi" (five) and "kuusi" (six). Four of the characters in "Think Blue, Count Two" are called "Thirteen" in different languages: Tiga-belas (both in Indonesian and Malay), Trece (Spanish), Talatashar (based on an Arabic dialect form ثلاث عشر, thalāth ʿashar) and Sh'san (based on Mandarin 十三, shísān, where the "í" is never pronounced). Other names, notably that of Lord Jestocost (Russian Жестокость, Cruelty), are non-English but not numbers.
 Remnants of modern culture accordingly appear as valued antiquities or sometimes just as unrecognized survivals, lending a rare feeling of nostalgia for the present to the stories.

Published non-fiction

The Political Doctrines of Sun Yat-Sen: An Exposition of the San Min Chu I (1937)
 Government in Republican China (1938)
 The China of Chiang K'ai-shek: A Political Study (1941)
 Psychological Warfare (1948; revised second edition, 1954 - available online)
Foreign milieux (HBM 200/1) (1951)
 Immediate improvement of theater-level psychological warfare in the Far East (1951)
Far Eastern Government and Politics: China and Japan (1954; with Djang Chu and Ardath W. Burks)
"Draft statement of a ten-year China and Indochina policy, 1956–1966" (1956)
 Essays on military psychological operations (1966)

Unpublished novels
1939 (rewritten in 1947) General Death
1946 Journey in Search of a Destination
1947-1948 The Dead Can Bite (a.k.a. Sarmantia)

Published fiction

Short stories
Titles marked with an asterisk * are independent stories not related to the Instrumentality universe.

"War No. 81-Q" (original version, June 1928) *
"Scanners Live in Vain" (June 1950)
"The Game of Rat and Dragon" (October 1955)
"Mark Elf" (May 1957) 
"The Burning of the Brain" (October 1958)
"Western Science Is So Wonderful" (December 1958) *
"No, No, Not Rogov!" (February 1959) 
"Nancy" (March 1959) *
"When the People Fell" (April 1959) 
"Golden the Ship Was—Oh! Oh! Oh!" (April 1959)
"Angerhelm" (June 1959) *
"The Fife Of Bodhidharma" (June 1959) *
"The Lady Who Sailed The Soul" (April 1960) 
"Alpha Ralpha Boulevard" (June 1961)
"Mother Hitton's Littul Kittons" (June 1961)
"A Planet Named Shayol" (October 1961)
"From Gustible's Planet"(July 1962)
"The Ballad of Lost C'Mell" (October 1962)
"Think Blue, Count Two" (February 1963)

The stories making up the collection Quest of the Three Worlds:
"On the Gem Planet" (October 1963)
"On the Storm Planet" (February 1965)
"On the Sand Planet" (December 1965)
"Three to a Given Star" (October 1965)
"Drunkboat" (October 1963)
"The Good Friends" (October 1963) *
"The Boy Who Bought Old Earth" (The first half of "Norstrilia", April 1964, adapted into "The Planet Buyer") 
"The Store Of Heart's Desire" (The second half of "Norstrilia", May 1964, adapted into "The Underpeople") 
"The Crime and the Glory of Commander Suzdal" (May 1964)
"The Dead Lady of Clown Town" (August 1964)
"Under Old Earth" (February 1966) 
"Down to a Sunless Sea" (October 1975) (with Genevieve Linebarger)
"The Queen of the Afternoon" (April 1978) 
"The Colonel Came Back from the Nothing-at-All" (May 1979)
"Himself in Anachron" (1993) (completed by Genevieve Linebarger)
"War No. 81-Q" (rewritten version, 1993)

Book format

 Ria (1947; writing as "Felix C. Forrest")
 Carola (1948; writing as "Felix C. Forrest")
 Atomsk: A Novel of Suspense (1949; writing as "Carmichael Smith")
 You Will Never Be The Same (1963, collection of short science fiction stories)
 The Planet Buyer (1964; first half of Norstrilia, with some rearrangement)
 Space Lords (1965; short science fiction stories)
 Quest of the Three Worlds (1966; four related science fiction novellas)
 The Underpeople (1968; second half of Norstrilia, with some rearrangement)
 Under Old Earth and Other Explorations (1970; short science fiction stories)
 Stardreamer (1971; short science fiction stories)

 Norstrilia (1975; first complete publication in intended form)
 The Best of Cordwainer Smith (1975; short science fiction stories)
 The Instrumentality of Mankind (1979; short science fiction stories)
 The Rediscovery of Man (1993; definitive and complete compilation of short science fiction writings)
 Norstrilia (1994; corrected edition with variant texts)
 We the Underpeople (2006; collection of 5 Instrumentality of Mankind short stories & the novel Norstrilia)
 When the People Fell (2007; collection of many Instrumentality of Mankind short stories, including all of those previously collected in Quest of the Three Worlds)

See also
Cordwainer Smith Rediscovery Award

References

External links
 
 Official webite
 
 
 
 
 
 
 Arlington National Cemetery: Linebarger
 Paul Myron Anthony Linebarger Papers at the Hoover Institution Archives
 "Remembering Cordwainer Smith," Ted Gioia (The Atlantic Monthly)
Past Masters: Forest of Incandescent Bliss by Bud Webster at Galactic Central
 
 Felix C. Forrest (3 records) and Carmichael Smith (no records) at LC Authorities
 
 

 

1913 births
1966 deaths
20th-century American novelists
American Episcopalians
American male novelists
American military writers
American science fiction writers
American short story writers
American sinologists
Burials at Arlington National Cemetery
Duke University faculty
Johns Hopkins University faculty
Johns Hopkins University alumni
Writers from Milwaukee
Psychological warfare theorists
United States Army colonels
Religion in science fiction
American male short story writers
Novelists from Wisconsin
Novelists from Maryland
American male non-fiction writers
People of the United States Office of War Information
United States Army personnel of World War II
20th-century American male writers
20th-century pseudonymous writers